The Philippines national ice hockey team may refer to:
 Philippines men's national ice hockey team
 Philippines women's national ice hockey team